Wanda Łyżwińska, née Kapusta (born 9 July 1953, in Piaseczno) is a Polish former politician. She was elected to the Sejm on 25 September 2005, getting 7842 votes in 17 Radom district as a candidate from Samoobrona Rzeczpospolitej Polskiej list.

She was also a member of Sejm 2001-2005.

See also
Members of Polish Sejm 2005-2007

External links
Wanda Łyżwińska - parliamentary page - includes declarations of interest, voting record, and transcripts of speeches.

1953 births
Living people
People from Piaseczno
Members of the Polish Sejm 2005–2007
Members of the Polish Sejm 2001–2005
Women members of the Sejm of the Republic of Poland
Self-Defence of the Republic of Poland politicians
21st-century Polish women politicians